Damianópolis is a municipality in eastern Goiás state, Brazil.  The population was 3,597 (2007) in a total area of 415.3 km2.

Location
Damianópolis is located to the east of the important BR-020 highway and west of the border with the state of Bahia.  Connections with this highway are made by paved road by way of Mambaí.

The distance to Goiânia is 528 km.  Highway connections are made by BR-153 / Anápolis / GO-060 / Alexânia / Planaltina / Formosa / GO-020 / BR-030 / Vila Boa / Alvorada do Norte / GO-236 / Buritinópolis / Mambaí / GO-108.

Municipal boundaries are with:
north:  Buritinópolis and Mambaí
west:  Alvorada do Norte
south:  Sítio d'Abadia

Demographics
Population density:  8.44 inhabitants/km2 (2007)  
Total population in 1980: 3,528
Total population in 2007: 3,507
Urban population: 1,846
Rural population: 1,661
Population growth:   -0.08% 1996/2007

Economy
The economy is based on cattle raising (24,400 head in 2006) and agriculture, especially the growing of soybeans and corn.
Industrial units: 0
Retail commercial units: 35
Motor vehicles (Automobiles and pickup trucks):  105 (2007)
Number of inhabitants per motor vehicle:  33.4 (2007)

Agricultural data 2006
Farms:  421
Total area:  28,708 ha.
Area of permanent crops: 47 ha.
Area of perennial crops: 1,743 ha.
Area of natural pasture:  23,313 ha. 
Area of woodland and forests:  3,050 ha. 
Persons dependent on farming:  1,300
Number of tractors: 46
Cattle herd:  24,400  
Main crop:  corn with 600 hectares planted

Education and health
Literacy rate: 75.6%
Infant mortality rate: 41.7 in 1,000 live births
Schools: 12
Classrooms: 32
Teachers: 67
Students: 1,147
Hospitals: 01 with 14 beds
Public health clinics (SUS): 02

Ranking on the United Nations Human Development Index

In 2000 Damianópolis was ranked 237 out of 242 municipalities in the state of Goiás on the United Nations Human Development Index with a score of 0.634. 
Life expectancy:  63.176
Adult literacy:  0.718
School attendance rate:  0.807
HDI-M:  0.634
State ranking:  237 (out of 242 municipalities in 2000)
National ranking:  4,047 (out of 5,507 municipalities in 2000)

See also 
List of municipalities in Goiás
Microregions of Goiás
Vão do Paranã Microregion

References

Municipalities in Goiás